Jim McNally (born December 13, 1943) is an American retired football coach, whose 28-year professional coaching career in the National Football League (NFL) included tenures with the Cincinnati Bengals, Carolina Panthers and New York Giants before retiring following a four-year stint with the Buffalo Bills.

McNally began his coaching career for the University at Buffalo in 1965 and also coached at Marshall University, Boston College and Wake Forest.  McNally won himself a place in the U.B. Athletic Hall of Fame in 1982 in recognition of both his Bulls playing career (1961–1964) and also his coaching expertise.  He was inducted into the Greater Buffalo Sports Hall of Fame in 2008.

Since his retirement, McNally puts on an offensive and defensive line teaching camps and clinics  and serves as a volunteer fundraiser with the University at Buffalo.

In the film We Are Marshall, which tells the true story of a Football Team that was reconstructed after a tragic plane accident, the character of McNally is played by Ron Clinton Smith.

References

External links
 

1943 births
Living people
Boston College Eagles football coaches
Buffalo Bills coaches
Buffalo Bulls football coaches
Buffalo Bulls football players
Carolina Panthers coaches
Cincinnati Bengals coaches
Marshall Thundering Herd football coaches
New York Giants coaches
Wake Forest Demon Deacons football coaches
Sportspeople from Buffalo, New York